Oksigen was a youth-orientated radio station operated by NATO from studios located in the Ramići Metal Factory in Banja Luka, Bosnia and Herzegovina, from 1999 to 2005. Set up after the Yugoslav Wars the late 1990s, the objective of Oksigen was to unite Serbians, Croats, and Bosnians in a tolerant multicultural state by positively influencing young people.

References

Defunct radio stations
History of NATO
Radio stations in Bosnia and Herzegovina
Radio stations established in 1999
Radio stations disestablished in 2005
1999 establishments in Bosnia and Herzegovina

2005 disestablishments in Bosnia and Herzegovina
Defunct mass media in Bosnia and Herzegovina